The Inclosure Acts, which use an archaic spelling of the word now usually spelt "enclosure", cover enclosure of open fields and common land in England and Wales, creating legal property rights to land previously held in common. Between 1604 and 1914, over 5,200 individual enclosure acts were passed, affecting 28,000 km2.

History

Before the enclosures in England, a portion of the land was categorized as "common" or "waste". "Common" land was under the control of the lord of the manor, but certain rights on the land such as pasture, pannage, or estovers were held variously by certain nearby properties, or (occasionally) in gross by all manorial tenants. "Waste" was land without value as a farm strip – often very narrow areas (typically less than a yard wide) in awkward locations (such as cliff edges, or inconveniently shaped manorial borders), but also bare rock, and so forth. "Waste" was not officially used by anyone, and so was often farmed by landless peasants.

The remaining land was organised into a large number of narrow strips, each tenant possessing a number of disparate strips throughout the manor, as would the manorial lord. Called the open-field system, it was administered by manorial courts, which exercised some collective control. What might now be termed a single field would have been divided under this system among the lord and his tenants; poorer peasants (serfs or copyholders, depending on the era) were allowed to live on the strips owned by the lord in return for cultivating his land. The system facilitated common grazing and crop rotation.

Any individual might possess several strips of land within the manor, often at some distance from one another. Seeking better financial returns, landowners looked for more efficient farming techniques. Enclosure acts for small areas had been passed sporadically since the 12th century, but advances in agricultural knowledge and technology in the 18th century made them more commonplace. Because tenants, or even copyholders, had legally enforceable rights on the land, substantial compensation was provided to extinguish them; thus many tenants were active supporters of enclosure, though it enabled landlords to force reluctant tenants to comply with the process.

With legal control of the land, landlords introduced innovations in methods of crop production, increasing profits and supporting the Agricultural Revolution; higher productivity also enabled landowners to justify higher rents for the people working the land. In 1801, the Inclosure (Consolidation) Act was passed to tidy up previous acts. In 1845, another General Inclosure Act instituted the appointment of Inclosure Commissioners, who could enclose land without submitting a request to Parliament.

The powers granted in the Inclosure Act 1773 of the Parliament of Great Britain were often abused by landowners: the preliminary meetings where enclosure was discussed, intended to be held in public, often took place in the presence of only the local landowners, who regularly chose their own solicitors, surveyors and commissioners to decide on each case. In 1786 there were still 250,000 independent landowners, but in the course of only thirty years their number was reduced to 32,000.

The tenants displaced by the process often left the countryside to work in the towns. This contributed to the Industrial Revolution – at the very moment new technological advances required large numbers of workers, a concentration of large numbers of people in need of work had emerged; the former country tenants and their descendants became workers in industrial factories within cities.

A poem from the 18th century reads as a protest against the inclosure acts:

List of acts
The Inclosure Act 1773 (13 Geo.3 c.81)

The Inclosure Acts 1845 to 1882 mean:
 
The Inclosure Act 1845 (8 & 9 Vict. c. 118)
The Inclosure Act 1846 (9 & 10 Vict. c. 70)
The Inclosure Act 1847 (10 & 11 Vict. c. 111)
The Inclosure Act 1848 (11 & 12 Vict. c. 99)
The Inclosure Act 1849 (12 & 13 Vict. c. 83)
The Inclosure Commissioners Act 1851 (14 & 15 Vict. c. 53)
The Inclosure Act 1852 (15 & 16 Vict. c. 79)
The Inclosure Act 1854 (17 & 18 Vict. c. 97)
The Inclosure Act 1857 (20 & 21 Vict. c. 31)
The Inclosure Act 1859 (22 & 23 Vict. c. 43)
The Inclosure, etc. Expenses Act 1868 (31 & 32 Vict. c. 89)
The Commons Act 1876 (39 & 40 Vict. c. 56)
The Commons (Expenses) Act 1878 (41 & 42 Vict. c. 56)
The Commons Act 1879 (42 & 43 Vict. c. 37)
The Commonable Rights Compensation Act 1882 (45 & 46 Vict. c. 15)

See also
English land law
Common land
Enclosure
List of short titles
Primitive accumulation of capital

Notes

Citations

References
 

The Parliamentary Debates, Volume 80. By Great Britain. Parliament.p. 483
Parliamentary Papers, House of Commons and Command, Volume 12. By Great Britain. Parliament. House of Commons 104 p. 380 
Edinburgh Review, Or, Critical Journal, Volume 62. p. 327
The Pictorial History of England, Volume 6. By George Lillie Craik, Charles Knight p. 781
The English Peasantry and the Enclosure of Common Fields. By Gilbert Slater
An Analytical Digest of the Reports of Cases Decided in the Courts of Common Law, and Equity, of Appeal, and Nisi Prius. By Henry Jeremy. p. 40
The Fence. By Washburn & Moen Manufacturing Company p. 21
The Contemporary Review, Volume 67. p. 703
Alienated tithes in appropriated and impropriated parishes. p. 38

Further reading
Chambers, Jonathan D. "Enclosure and labour supply in the industrial revolution", Economic History Review 5.3 (1953): 319–343 in JSTOR
Linebaugh, Peter. The Magna Carta Manifesto: Liberties and Commons for All. Berkeley: University of California Press, 2008.

External links
Thesaurus of Acts
Parliamentary enclosure – Surrey County Council
Archive details and description
The Enclosures of the 18th Century, BBC Radio 4 discussion with Rosemary Sweet, Murray Pittock & Mark Overton (In Our Time, May 1, 2008)

Lists of legislation by short title and collective title
Acts of the Parliament of the United Kingdom concerning England and Wales
Enclosures
United Kingdom Acts of Parliament 1845
United Kingdom Acts of Parliament 1846
United Kingdom Acts of Parliament 1847
United Kingdom Acts of Parliament 1848
United Kingdom Acts of Parliament 1849
United Kingdom Acts of Parliament 1851
United Kingdom Acts of Parliament 1852
United Kingdom Acts of Parliament 1854
United Kingdom Acts of Parliament 1857
United Kingdom Acts of Parliament 1859
United Kingdom Acts of Parliament 1868
United Kingdom Acts of Parliament 1876
United Kingdom Acts of Parliament 1878
United Kingdom Acts of Parliament 1879
United Kingdom Acts of Parliament 1882
Agriculture legislation in the United Kingdom
History of agriculture in England
History of agriculture in Wales
English land law

fr:Mouvement des enclosures
ru:Огораживания